The dotterel or Eurasian dotterel (Eudromias morinellus) is a species of plover found in the Northern Hemisphere.

Dotterel may also refer to other plovers:
 Banded dotterel or double-banded plover (Charadrius bicinctus)
 Black-fronted dotterel (Elseyornis melanops)
 Hooded dotterel (Thinornis cucullatus)
 Inland dotterel (Peltohyas australis)
 New Zealand dotterel (Charadrius obscurus)
 Red-kneed dotterel (Erythrogonys cinctus)
 Shore dotterel (Thinornis novaeseelandiae)
 Tawny-throated dotterel (Oreopholus ruficollis)

Other uses
 Dotterel (1817 ship), launched in British India, wrecked in 1827

See also 
 Doterel (disambiguation)
 Dotterel filefish (Aluterus heudelotii), an Atlantic fish